Year 1432 (MCDXXXII) was a leap year starting on Tuesday (link will display the full calendar) of the Julian calendar.

Events 
 January–December 
 January 1 – Iliaș succeeds his father as Prince of Moldavia.
 Spring – An Albanian revolt, led by Gjergj Arianit Komneni, breaks out against the Ottoman Empire, and spreads through most of Albania.
 April – At the end of the Hook and Cod wars, Jacqueline, Countess of Hainaut and Countess of Holland and Zeeland, is forced by Philip the Good, Duke of Burgundy, to abdicate all her estates in his favour, ending Hainaut and Holland as independent counties.
 May 6 – Jan van Eyck's Ghent Altarpiece is first presented to the public.
 June 1 – Battle of San Romano: Florence defeats Siena.
 August 31 – Sigismund Kęstutaitis attempts the capture or murder of Švitrigaila, his rival for the throne of the Grand Duchy of Lithuania. Švitrigaila manages to escape. 
 December 8 – Lithuanian Civil War (1432–1438): The first battle between the forces of Švitrigaila and Sigismund Kęstutaitis is fought near the town of Oszmiana (Ashmyany), launching the most active phase of the civil war in the Grand Duchy of Lithuania. 

 Date unknown 
 The Université de Caen is founded.
 The first baccalaureate service is believed to have originated at the University of Oxford.

Births 

 January 15 – King Afonso V of Portugal (d. 1481)
 March 1 – Isabella of Coimbra, Portuguese infanta (d. 1455)
 March 2 – Countess Palatine Margaret of Mosbach, Countess consort of Hanau (d. 1457)
 March 30 – Mehmed II, the Conqueror, Ottoman Sultan (d. 1481)
 April 12 – Anne of Austria, Landgravine of Thuringia, consort of William III, Landgrave of Thuringia (d. 1462)
 August 15 – Luigi Pulci, Italian poet (d. 1484)
 date unknown – Pope Innocent VIII (d. 1492)
 probable – Alvise Cadamosto, Italian explorer (d. 1488)

Deaths 
 January 1 – Alexandru cel Bun, Prince of Moldavia
 January 22 – John of Schoonhoven, Flemish theologian (b. 1356)
 May 5 – Francesco Bussone da Carmagnola, Italian adventurer (executed)
 May 19 – Joan of Valois, Duchess of Alençon, French duchess (b. 1409)
 June 1 – Dan II, former Prince of Wallachia (killed in battle against Ottomans)
 June 13 – Uko Fockena, East Frisian chieftain (b. c. 1408)
 June 29 – Janus of Cyprus (b. 1375)
 October 19 – John de Mowbray, 2nd Duke of Norfolk, English politician (b. 1392)
 November 14 – Anne of Burgundy, Duchess of Bedford (b. 1404)
 date unknown
 Gyaltsab Je, throne holder of the Gelug tradition of Buddhism (b. 1364)
 Art Mac Cathmhaoil, Bishop of Clogher
 Centurione II Zaccaria, last Prince of Achaea, Baron of Arcadia

References